Howard Junior High School, also known as Prosperity School, Shiloh School, and Shiloh Rosenwald School, is a historic Rosenwald school located at Prosperity, Newberry County, South Carolina.  It was built in 1924–1925, and is a one-story, frame, double-pile, rectangular building on an open brick pier foundation.  It originally had four classrooms; two additional classrooms were added in the 1930s.

It was listed on the National Register of Historic Places in 2009.

References

School buildings on the National Register of Historic Places in South Carolina
Defunct schools in South Carolina
Educational institutions established in 1925
African-American history of South Carolina
Buildings and structures in Newberry County, South Carolina
Rosenwald schools in South Carolina
1925 establishments in South Carolina
National Register of Historic Places in Newberry County, South Carolina